Dominick "Baldy Dom" Canterino (Born January 4, 1929 – June, 1990) was a caporegime in the Genovese crime family.

He was born to first-generation Italian immigrants from Perugia, Italy. A Genovese captain from Bensonhurst who ran the family's Greenwich Village Crew, Canterino was a regular at Sullivan Street's Triangle Social Club, the de facto headquarters of the Genovese family. Federal Bureau of Investigation (FBI) surveillance regularly spotted Canterino at 3:00 am, driving Genovese boss Vincent Gigante to a friend's townhouse in Manhattan. Canterino once told the FBI that he worked as a dockworker and foreman, and once "did time as a thief". An FBI report also notes, "Canterino discussed the problems of being married and having a girlfriend on the side, which included having to split time between the two on holidays."

In December 1988, Canterino and Morris Levy, president of Roulette Records, were convicted of conspiring to extort $1.25 million from Pennsylvania record producer Frank LaMonte in Camden, New Jersey. Canterino was sentenced to 12 years in prison.

On May 31, 1990, Canterino was indicted for racketeering in the Windows Case. Through their control of a local construction union, the Genoveses and three other New York crime families were fixing prices (and allocating work) that contractors offered the New York City Housing Authority for installing new thermal pane windows in city housing projects. The mob families grossed tens of millions of dollars from these contracts.

After the trial had begun, Canterino suffered a heart attack and was dropped from the case. Canterino retired and became inactive. He died June, 1990.

References

 Spin Magazine "Back in the Days of 88" December 1988

1990 deaths
Genovese crime family
American gangsters of Italian descent
People of Umbrian descent
1929 births
People from Bensonhurst, Brooklyn